The 1896 Washington football team was an American football team that represented the University of Washington during the 1896 college football season. In its second season under coach Ralph Nichols, the team compiled a 2–3 record and was outscored by its opponents by a combined total of 40 to 20. Jack Lindsay was the team captain.

Schedule

References

Washington
Washington Huskies football seasons
Washington football